James Pond: Underwater Agent is a 1990 platform video game that was developed by British video game developer Millennium Interactive and published by Millennium Interactive and Electronic Arts for the Amiga, Atari ST, Acorn Archimedes, and Sega Genesis. It was the first in the James Pond series of games.

Gameplay

James Pond has to solve puzzles to defeat the enemy and the gameplay revolves around finding objects to perform specific tasks, such as keys to rescue captured lobsters, or sponges to bung up the holes in leaking oil tankers. James must also fire bubbles at his enemies to trap them, before popping them to finish them off.

Plot
A nefarious supervillain named "Doctor Maybe" (a play on Dr. No) has overtaken the ruthless megacorporation Acme Oil Company, and is not only filling the oceans with radiation and toxic waste but even threatening all the world from his underwater lair. The protagonist of the story and player character of the game is an intelligent, mutated anthropomorphic mudskipper who is given the name "James Pond" (after the legendary spy James Bond) and hired by the British Secret Service to protect the seas and take out the bad guys in underwater areas. He is also suave enough to seduce numerous attractive mermaids, some of whom act as double agents as is common with James Bond's love interests. The game spoofs James Bond movies with levels mimicking their titles, with level names like "License to Bubble" (after Licence to Kill), "A View to a Spill" (after A View to a Kill), "Leak and Let Die" (after Live and Let Die) and "From Three Mile Island with Love" (after From Russia with Love).

Reception

James Pond received mixed but mostly positive reviews. VideoGames & Computer Entertainment gave the game seven out of ten, calling it "an entertaining and challenging undersea caper that should please just about anyone". Electronic Gaming Monthly gave it a four, four, three, and six, out of ten, calling it "not exciting or fun", but "a nice kids [sic] game". Mega Action gave James Pond a score of 82% writing: "James Pond does for fish as Sonic does for hedgehogs. It features some really cute baddies, making this game a real joy to play." Console XS gave a review score of 70%, they felt it was not a good conversion from the computer version and wrote that "Everything is far too bland and boring to excite Pond fans." Megatech gave the genesis version an overall score of 77% writing: "A cute and entertaining twelve-level aquatic platform game which provides plenty of fun."

Mean Machines magazine, however, suggested that the Genesis port of the game was "Better than Sonic" on the front page of their then latest issue.

Legacy
James Pond was followed by two sequels: James Pond 2: Codename Robocod and James Pond 3: Operation Starfish. There was also a spin-off sports-themed game The Aquatic Games and a cameo in Rolo to the Rescue.
James Pond returned in James Pond in the Deathly Shallows for the iPhone and the iPad on June 30, 2011.

In September 2013, Gameware Europe, who acquired the James Pond license in 2003, launched a Kickstarter for a new game in the series, James Pond: Pond is Back!, featuring the game's original designer, Chris Sorrell. The Kickstarter was canceled on October 7 as the funding target looked unlikely to be achieved.

References

External links

Game review
Article on James Pond from Sega-16.com
Environment Agency 'Licence to Fish' film

1990 video games
Acorn Archimedes games
Amiga games
Atari ST games
Pond, James
Game Boy games
 
Millennium Interactive games
Parody video games
Platform games
Sega Genesis games
Video games scored by Richard Joseph
Video games developed in the United Kingdom
Video games with underwater settings